Daniel Wozniak is a paralympic athlete from Poland competing mainly in category T12 sprint events.
Wozniak has competed in the sprints at three paralympics starting in 2000.  In 2000 he competed in all three sprint events winning the silver medal in the 400m, at the following games in 2004 he again competed in all three sprints but failed to win any medals.  In Beijing in the 2008 he competed in the 200m and 400m but again was unable to add to his medal tally.

References

Paralympic athletes of Poland
Athletes (track and field) at the 2000 Summer Paralympics
Athletes (track and field) at the 2004 Summer Paralympics
Place of birth missing (living people)
Year of birth missing (living people)
Athletes (track and field) at the 2008 Summer Paralympics
Paralympic silver medalists for Poland
Polish male sprinters
Living people
Medalists at the 2000 Summer Paralympics
Paralympic medalists in athletics (track and field)
21st-century Polish people
20th-century Polish people
Visually impaired sprinters
Paralympic sprinters